Blackwater railway station was a station at Blackwater, Isle of Wight, off the south coast of England.

History
Located in the centre of the island on the A3020 road, it was an intermediate station on the line from Newport to Sandown, which was originally operated by the Isle of Wight (Newport Junction) Railway (incorporated 1868). The station opened in 1875 and closed, along with the line itself, in 1956. A rural station whose "heyday was before the advent of the motor car", during the inter-war years it was known for its large collection of enamel advertising boards. The station survives as an enlarged private house known as Brambles. The old railway track is now a cycle track, though this diverges slightly from the course of the old railway around the station building itself.

See also 
 List of closed railway stations in Britain

References

External links 
 Blackwater station on navigable 1946 O. S. map
 Subterranea Britannica's page on Blackwater

Disused railway stations on the Isle of Wight
Former Isle of Wight Central Railway stations
Railway stations in Great Britain opened in 1875
Railway stations in Great Britain closed in 1956